The Power of Now: A Guide to Spiritual Enlightenment is a book by Eckhart Tolle. It presents itself as a discussion about how people interact with themselves and others. The concept of self reflection and presence in the moment are presented along with simple exercises for the achievement of its principles.
Published in the late 1990s, the book was recommended by Oprah Winfrey and has been translated into 33 languages. As of 2009, it was estimated that three million copies had been sold in North America.

Philosophical outlook
The book  draws from a variety of spiritual traditions, and one reviewer described it as "Buddhism mixed with mysticism and a few references to Jesus Christ, a sort of New Age re-working of Zen." It uses these traditions to describe a "belief system based on living in the present moment". Its core message is that people's emotional problems are rooted in their identification with their minds. The author writes that an individual should be aware of their present moment instead of losing themselves in worry and anxiety about the past or future.

According to the book, only the present moment is real and only the present moment matters, and both an individual's past and future are created by their thoughts. The author maintains that people's insistence that they have control of their life is an illusion "that only brings pain". The book also describes methods of relaxation and meditation to help readers anchor themselves in the present. These suggestions include slowing down by avoiding multi-tasking, spending time in nature, and letting go of worries about the future. Some of the concepts contained in The Power of Now, such as the human ego and its negative effects on happiness, are further elaborated in the author's later books, especially A New Earth: Awakening to Your Life's Purpose (2005).

Selected chapters
The chapters of the book are: 

Various chapters emphasize a philosophy of destroying the destructive dominance of the mind and ego in an effort to overcome the pain body. According to the author, his philosophy is directed towards people and their search for personal happiness and also has the potential to give insight into historical disasters like the justification of what he sees as the evil of capitalism.

Introduction
In the book's introduction the author relates his past experiences of continuous anxiety with periods of suicidal depression. Later, when he was 29 years old, he had a personal epiphany and writes: "I heard the words 'resist nothing' as if spoken inside my chest." He relates that he felt as if he were falling into a void and afterwards "there was no more fear."

Chapter Two: "Consciousness: The Way Out of Pain"
In Chapter Two, Tolle tells the reader that they must recognize their personal ego "without the ego creating an antagonistic response to its own denial or destruction" and explains the purposelessness of the "mental pain and anguish" that people hold on to. According to the book: "The pain-body consists of trapped life-energy that has split off from your total energy field and has temporarily become autonomous through the unnatural process of mind identification." In this chapter the author writes: "pain can only feed on pain. Pain cannot feed on joy. It finds it quite indigestible".  The author goes on to write that "many people live with a tormentor in their head that continuously attacks and punishes them and drains them of vital energy. It is the cause of untold misery and unhappiness."

Chapter Three: "Moving Deeply Into the Now"
In Chapter Three, the author writes: "In the normal, mind-identified or unenlightened state of consciousness, the power and creative potential that lie concealed in the Now are completely obscured by psychological time. You cannot find yourself by going into the past. You can find yourself by coming into the present. Life is now. There was never a time when your life was not now, nor will there ever be."

Chapter Four: "Mind Strategies for Avoiding the Now"
In Chapter Four, Tolle says that "tomorrow's bills are not the problem" and can be a "core delusion" that changes a "mere situation, event or emotion" into a reason for suffering and unhappiness. The book also calls "waiting" a "state of mind" that we should snap ourselves out of.

Reception
The book was originally published in 1997 by Namaste Publishing in Vancouver. It was republished in 1999 by New World Library, and this edition reached and remained on the New York Times bestseller list for years afterwards. The book has been translated into 33 languages, including Arabic.

In 2000, the book was listed as recommended reading in Oprah Winfrey's O magazine and, according to Winfrey, the actress Meg Ryan also recommended it.  A Christian author, Andrew Ryder, wrote a dissertation saying that "Tolle moves the traditional [Christian] teaching forward by illustrating how our obsession with the past and the future ... [prevents] us from giving our full attention to the present moment." William Bloom, a spokesperson for the holistic, mind-body-spirit movement in the UK, wrote that "Tolle's approach is very body aware. He's done it in a nice accessible way for people."

Some reviewers were more critical of the book. According to a review in the Telegraph Herald, the book is not very well-written but contains some good teachings. Andrea Sachs wrote in Time magazine that the book is "awash in spiritual mumbo jumbo" and "unhelpful for those looking for practical advice". An article in The Independent said that "there is not very much new about The Power of Now" and described it as "a sort of New Age re-working of Zen."

In popular culture
When Paris Hilton was incarcerated at the Century Regional Detention Facility in California in June 2007 she brought with her a copy of The Power of Now. Singer Annie Lennox chose The Power of Now as one of her "desert island books", as did the professional skater Tony Hawk. Singer Katy Perry stated that she was inspired to write "This Moment", a song from her 2013 album Prism, after she heard the audiobook of The Power of Now. Kendrick Lamar references this book throughout his 2022 album Mr Morale & The Big Steppers.

See also
 Autobiography of a Yogi
 Mindfulness
 Satipatthana
 Be Here Now

References

External links 

New Age books
1997 non-fiction books
Books about spirituality
Self-help books